Micropterocerus longifacies is a species of ulidiid or picture-winged fly in the genus Micropterocerus of the family Ulidiidae.

References

Ulidiidae